A noite do castelo ("The Night of the Castle") is an opera seria in three acts by the Brazilian Romantic era composer, Antônio Carlos Gomes.  The libretto in Portuguese by Antônio José Fernandes dos Reis was based on António Feliciano de Castilho's 1830 poem of the same name. The work premiered at the Theatro Lyrico Fluminense in Rio de Janeiro on September 4, 1861.

Performance history
A noite do castelo was Gomes' first opera and composed during his student years in Rio de Janeiro. He was encouraged to have the opera performed by José Amat, the first administrator of the Imperial Academy of Music and Opera Lyrica Nacional. In 1860, Gomes wrote a letter from Rio de Janeiro to his father, inviting him to the opening night which would take place the following year:
"Meu bom pai. Escrevo esta só para não demorar uma boa notícia. Afinal tenho um libreto. Foi extraído do poema de Castilho - A Noite do Castelo. Hoje mesmo começo a trabalhar na composição da ópera, prepare-se portanto, para vir ao Rio de Janeiro em 1861. Saudades muitas às manas e aos manos, principalmente ao Juca, abençoe-me como a seu filho muito grato. Carlos"

(Translation: "My good father. I write you this so that I do not delay any longer some good news to you. Finally, I have a libretto. It has been taken from a poem by Castilho - A Noite do Castelo. Today, I started working on the composition for the opera. Get yourself ready, then, to come to Rio de Janeiro in 1861. Send my longing love to my sisters and brothers, specially to Juca, bless me as your very thankful son, Carlos.")

The first performance of A noite do castelo by the Opera Lyrica Nacional at the Theatro Lyrico Fluminense on September 4, 1861, was loudly applauded, with contemporary accounts describing the audience as being "in delirium". Gomes conducted the performance, which coincided with the wedding anniversary of Emperor Pedro II, to whom the work was dedicated. Gomes was made a Cavalier of the Imperial Order of the Rose on the stage that night with Pedro II himself pinning the medal on the composer.

A noite do castelo never entered the operatic repertory outside of Brazil and in modern times it is very rarely performed even there. However, there is a 1978 live recording of a performance by the Orquestra Sinfônica da Campinas, the Coral da Universidade Estadual de Campinas and the Coral da Universidade de São Paulo.

Roles

References
Notes

Sources

Behar, Eli (1980) Vultos do Brasil, Hemus, p. 95. 
Brasil Cultura, Biography of Carlos Gomes (in Portuguese). Accessed 1 November 2008.
de Carvalho Ismael, César, Correspondências trocadas for Carlos Gomes entre 1860 a 1896, Anais da 58ª Reunião Anual da SBPC, July 2006. Description of the collection of original letters by the composer at UNICAMP's Centro de Memória and at the Carlos Gomes Museum.
Filho, Manuel Alves,"Lenita Nogueira lança A história de Carlos Gomes por ele mesmo", Universidade Estadual de Campinas (UNICAMP), September 27, 2007. Press release on the publication of the autobiography of Carlos Gomes with quotes from the original letter the composer wrote in 1860 to his father, inviting him to the opening night of A noite do castelo (in Portuguese). Accessed 1 November 2008.
Haag, Carlos "The heavy burden of being a national symbol, Pesquisa FAPESP, Fundação de Amparo à Pesquisa do Estado de São Paulo, November 2007. Accessed 2 November 2008.
Instituto geographico e historico da Bahia, Revista do Instituto geographico e historico da Bahia, N. 62, 1936.
Moore, Tom, "Carlos Gomes: A Forca Indomita (Review)", Notes, Music Library Association, June 1999. Accessed via subscription 1 November 2008.  
Nogueira, Lenita Waldige Mendes, Museu Carlos Gomes: catálogo de manuscritos musicais, Editora Arte & Ciencia, 415 pages, 1997. Catalogue of Antônio Carlos Gomes´ works in the Carlos Gomes Museum (in Portuguese).
Shaman, William et al. (1999) More EJS: Discography of the Edward J. Smith Recordings ("Unique Opera Records Corporation" (1972–1977), "A.N.N.A. Record Company" (1978–1982), "special-label" Issues (circa 1954-1981), and Addendum to "The Golden Age of Opera" Series), Greenwood Publishing Group. 
 Alessio Walter De Palma, Antonio Carlos Gomes. L’opera lirica tra il Brasile e l’Italia nel secondo Ottocento, Foggia, Odysseus, 2018.

External links
Fantinatti, João Marcos, "Personagem: Antônio Carlos Gomes - O maior músico campineiro", Pró-Memória de Campinas-SP, September 29, 2006. Chronology and biography of Carlos Gomes with sources from the Museum Carlos Gomes and other sources from his native city, Campinas (in Portuguese). Accessed 1 November 2008.
Museu Carlos Gomes. The museum, located in the Centro de Ciências Letras e Artes in Campinas, contains the complete and original archive of Antônio Carlos Gomes' compositions, letters and other papers and collections in the Museu Carlos Gomes (in Portuguese). Accessed 30 October 2010.

Portuguese-language operas
Operas by Carlos Gomes
Operas
1861 operas